{{Infobox football club season
 | club               = East Bengal
 | image              = 
 | season             = 2015–16
 | manager            =  Biswajit Bhattacharya Trevor Morgan
 | mgrtitle           = Head-Coach
 | chairman           = Dr Pranab Dasgupta
 | chrtitle           = President
 | stadium            = Salt Lake StadiumKalyani StadiumEast Bengal Ground
 | league             = I-League
 | league result      = 3rd
 | league2            = Calcutta Premier Division
 | league2 result     = Champions''
 | cup1               = Federation Cup
 | cup1 result        = Quarter-Finals
 | cup2               = Sheikh Kamal Trophy
 | cup2 result        = Runners-up
 | league topscorer   = Ranti Martins (12)
 | season topscorer   = Ranti Martins (17)
 | highest attendance = 
 | lowest attendance  = 
 | average attendance =
 
|pattern_b1  = _redhalf
|pattern_sh1 = 
|pattern_so1 = _2 gold stripes
|leftarm1    = FFDF00
|body1       = FFDF00
|rightarm1   = ff0000
|shorts1     = 000000
| socks1     = ff0000
|pattern_name1=Home kit
|pattern_b2  = _EastBengal201718_a
|pattern_la2 = _EastBengal1718a
|pattern_ra2 = _EastBengal1718a
|pattern_sh2 = _EastBengal000000
|pattern_so2 = _EastBengalFFFFFF
|leftarm2    = FFFFFF
|body2       = FFFFFF
|rightarm2   = FFFFFF
|shorts2     = 000000
|socks2      = FFFFFF
|pattern_name2=Away kit
|pattern_b3  = _yellowredstripes
|pattern_la3 =_redyellow
|pattern_ra3 =_redyellow
|pattern_sh3 =
|pattern_so3 = ffff00
|leftarm3    = 000080
|body3       = 000080
|rightarm3   = 000080
|shorts3     = 000080
|socks3      = ffff00
|pattern_name3=Third kit

| prevseason = 2014-15 
| nextseason = 2016–17
}}

The 2015–16 season is East Bengal FC's 96th season in existence. The club had won the Calcutta Football League this season and became the runners of 2015 Sheikh Kamal International Club Cup.

Pre-Season Overview
The club signed Do Dong-hyun, a South Korean attacking mid-fielder to support the striking part.
With the arrival of veteran defender Bello Razaq from Mohun Bagan, the team became stronger and the Red and Gold Brigade are hoping to seal the CFL championship and set another hexa record.
With the help of recent performances, The Club clinched to the 74th spot in the recent AFC Club Ranking, the highest among all Indian football clubs.

Season Overview

August
The club started their Calcutta Football League (CFL) campaign on 8 August by beating SVF Tollygunge Agragami FC by 1–0. In the next match, against Aryan F.C., the club managed a draw, the only draw of this CFL campaign. Then they went on winning all the matches against Bengal Nagpur Railway, Army XI, Mohammedan S.C., Police AC and Sports Authority of India.

September
Maintaining their winning streak of August, East Bengal started their September by beating Kalighat Milan Sangha F.C. by 4–3. This fixture was their toughest in this campaign as at a time, the team was trailing by 0-2 and then they managed to win it. 
The next fixture of the club was a prestigious Kolkata Derby against their arch rivals Mohun Bagan in which the team managed an easy 4–0 win with two stunning free kicks by Do Dong-hyun, the top scorer of the club, one of which came in just after 82 seconds from the kick off. This win sealed their league victory and their 118th win against their arch rivals. Moreover, it was the club's 6th consecutive CFL championship which is itself a record and they hold a similar 6 consecutive CFL League wins between the period 1970–75. 
The last fixture was against Southern Samity on 10 September. East Bengal with their reserved squad managed to win it and became the unbeatable champions of this CFL. Do Dong-hyun became the top scorer of both the club and the CFL.

October
The club went to play an international tournament in Bangladesh named 2015 Sheikh Kamal International Club Cup. The team draw set East Bengal in Group B on the fixture of this tour. Due to the absence of almost all the main and first team players of the club (all out on loan in different clubs of Indian Super League), the junior and reserve bench players had taken part in it. The club  brought Orok Essien and Subodh Kumar on loan for the tournament. East Bengal started off well by defeating Bangladesh club  Abahani Limited (Chittagong) by 2–1 on 21st Oct 2015. Young Prohlad scored on the match along with Mohammed Rafique. After that the most important player of midfield, Do Dong-hyun, had a knee injury which couldn't let him play for the rest of  the tour. The club kept on its winning streak by defeating the current best club of Pakistan K-Electric F.C. by a comfortable margin of 3–1. Then the club had its first draw of the tournament which was against Abahani Limited (Dhaka). Then the club went into the semis where they defeated (on 28th oct 2015) Mohammedan Sporting Club (Dhaka) by 3–0 to enter into the final. Ranti Martins scored a couple on the semis. On 30th Oct 2015, East Bengal FC played the final against Abahani Limited (Chittagong) once again after the very first match. But the young brigade could not seal the victory at the end in spite of taking a lead on the 9th minute by the goal scored by Avinabo Bag. This time East Bengal lost to the Bangladeshi club by 1–3. The brilliant performance of the junior players throughout the tournament came to an end with the defeat in final match. But the fight of the junior brigade were appreciated whole heartedly by the supporters of the club.

Transfers

In

Out

KitSupplier: Shiv Naresh / Sponsors:''' Kingfisher Premium, Peerless

Technical Staff

Competitions

Overall

Overview

Calcutta Football League

Table

Fixtures & results

Sheikh Kamal International Club Cup

Group B

Fixtures & results

I-League

Table

Fixtures & results

Federation Cup

Fixtures & results

Statistics

Appearances
 Players with no appearances are not included in the list.

Goal Scorers

References

See also
 2015–16 in Indian football

East Bengal Club seasons
East Bengal